At the national level, Samoa elects a legislature. The Fono or Legislative Assembly has 51 members elected for a five-year term from 51 electoral constituencies. Prior to 2019, the Legislative Assembly has 49 members, 47 members out of the matai (traditional heads of families) six of whom are elected from two-seat constituencies and 35 from single-seat constituencies, and 2 members by the non-Samoan nationals.  The head of state is elected for a five-year term by the Fono.

The voting age in Samoa is 21.

Samoa has a two-party system, which means that there are two dominant political parties.

Latest election

2021 Samoan by-elections

By-elections
Below is a list of recent by-elections:

See also
 Electoral calendar
 Electoral system

External links
 Elections in Samoa
 Adam Carr's Election Archive

 
Samoa